Liam Mark Kinsella (born 23 February 1996) is a professional footballer who plays as a midfielder for League Two club Walsall. Kinsella was born in England and has represented the Republic of Ireland at U19 level and U21 level.

Personal life
His father is former Republic of Ireland international footballer Mark Kinsella. His younger sister is Olympic gymnastics bronze medallist, Alice Kinsella.

Club career
Kinsella signed for Walsall as an eight-year-old and worked his way through various youth levels before signing his first professional contract in March 2014. He made his senior debut against Bradford City on 16 August 2014 and was named man of the match in a 0–0 draw.

He scored his first senior goal in a 2–0 win over Burton Albion in October 2015 to help Walsall leapfrog the Brewers to the top of the League One table. Kinsella described the goal as "one of the best moments of my career so far".

He was offered a new contract by Walsall at the end of the 2018–19 season. In January 2021 he signed a new two-year contract.

Kinsella was named as the club's Player of the Season in 2020–21 and 2021–22.

International career
Kinsella made his Republic of Ireland U19s debut on 25 February 2015 in a friendly match against Azerbaijan Under 19s. He was named in the starting eleven for the match at Tallaght Stadium. His second appearance came just two days later in a 2–0 win against the same opposition at the same venue.

He earned his first call-up to the Republic of Ireland U21s in September 2016 and made his debut 12 months later against Azerbaijan U21s.

Career statistics

Honours
Individual

 Walsall Player of the Year: 2020–21, 2021–22

References

External links

1996 births
Living people
English people of Irish descent
Sportspeople from Colchester
Republic of Ireland association footballers
Association football midfielders
Walsall F.C. players
English Football League players
Republic of Ireland youth international footballers
Republic of Ireland under-21 international footballers